Vyacheslav Amin (born 10 December 1976) is a retired Kyrgyzstani footballer who is a defender. He is well known for playing for Alga\SKA PVO\SKA-Shoro Bishkek and Abdish-Ata Kant. He was a member of the Kyrgyzstan national football team.

External links

1976 births
Living people
Kyrgyzstani footballers
Kyrgyzstan international footballers
Kyrgyzstani expatriate footballers
Association football defenders
FC Alga Bishkek players
Kyrgyzstani people of Russian descent